Gwon Sang-won (born 7 June 1969) is a South Korean swimmer. He competed in five events at the 1988 Summer Olympics.

References

External links
 

1969 births
Living people
South Korean male freestyle swimmers
Olympic swimmers of South Korea
Swimmers at the 1988 Summer Olympics
Place of birth missing (living people)
Asian Games medalists in swimming
Asian Games bronze medalists for South Korea
Swimmers at the 1990 Asian Games
Medalists at the 1990 Asian Games
20th-century South Korean people